The Bund Deutscher Jugend (BDJ) was a politically active German association with right-wing, to right-wing extremist and anti-communist leanings founded in 1950. In the beginning of 1953 the BDJ and its paramilitary arm, the Technischer Dienst, were forbidden as extreme right-wing organisations because of the planned murder of roughly 40 people and the creation of a secret organization.

History

The BDJ was founded on 23 June 1950 in Frankfurt/Main. The CIA-cryptonym for the BDJ was KMPRUDE and for the Technischer Dienst LCPROWL. The project outline in a declassified CIA file states the following objectives:

 The utilization of the League during the October 15 elections in Eastern Germany 
 Consolidating the League as a permanent nationwide organization 
 Employing the League in political warfare operations 
 Guerrilla warfare and sabotage training of selected segments of the Leagues membership.

In April 1951 the Technischer Dienst (technical service), a secret subsection of the BDJ, was founded on the programmatic basis of the partisan writings by Paul Lüth with the aim in mind, to form an armed resistance movement against "Bolshevism". The operation ran under the name LCPROWL BDJ Apparat. As of 1951 the budget for one year was $125.000.

The group was allegedly founded as part of the CIAs program of creating guerrilla and stay-behind groups in Germany and Western Europe that would fight the Soviets should they occupy Western Europe during a future confrontation. The CIA was training them in covert guerrilla warfare to be part of this future resistance movement. Many members of the BDJ were veterans of the Wehrmacht and Waffen-SS.

Prohibition Proceedings 

A 1952 raid by local police units on the BDJ's premises revealed that the U.S. funded the organization at a monthly sum of $50,000 and supplied it with arms, ammunition, and explosives. A weapons cache consisting of machine guns, grenades, light artillery guns, and explosives were found in the Odenwald near Frankfurt am Main. Seized documents also contained an assassination list naming 40 German political leaders - mainly politicians of the German social democratic party, SPD. Among them were Herbert Wehner, the former head of the SPD party, Erich Ollenhauer, the Hessian Minister of the Interior, Heinrich Zinnkann and the Mayor of Hamburg and Bremen. For a case of "emergency" scenario, the BDJ had already funnelled members in the SPD.
The U.S. Army Counter Intelligence Corps (CIC) took over custody of the German BDJ members and denied West German authorities access to them in the following months because the authorities intended to indict the members on charges of unlawful possession of weapons and planned murder. CIC agents continued to seize all remaining documents and refused to surrender them to West German authorities. As a result of the ongoing investigation, U.S. authorities admitted to having financed the BDJ for the training of guerrillas in case of war with the Soviet Union.

Ideology 
The Hessian federal Office for the Protection of the Constitution first described the BDJ in their reports as "strongly right wing" and "not yet an immediate danger to society". The office later amended the reports and added that the shift of the BDJ into right wing extremism is viewed as a possibility.

On 9 September 1952, the high ranking BDJ member and former SS-Hauptsturmführer, Hans Otto, who created a "hit list" with the names of 40 German politicians for the BDJ, surrendered himself to the police.

The BDJ was reclassified as an "unconstitutional right wing extremist group" and subsequently banned by the federal state of Hesse on 7 January 1953 and the other states by 
February of the same year.

See also 
Kampfgruppe gegen Unmenschlichkeit
Operation Gladio

Bibliography 
 All FOIA documents relating to project LCPROWL (243 documents)

References 

1950 establishments in Germany
1953 disestablishments in Germany
Far-right politics in Germany
Defunct organisations based in Germany
Anti-communist organizations
Anti-communism in Germany